The canton of Combs-la-Ville is a French administrative division, located in the arrondissement of Melun, in the Seine-et-Marne département (Île-de-France région).

Composition 
At the French canton reorganisation which came into effect in March 2015, the canton was expanded from 4 to 5 communes:
Brie-Comte-Robert
Combs-la-Ville
Lieusaint
Moissy-Cramayel
Réau

Demographics

See also
Cantons of the Seine-et-Marne department
Communes of the Seine-et-Marne department

References

Combs-la-Ville